Butts Band is the first album by Butts Band, released in 1974. "Pop-a-Top" was released as a single, with "Baja Bus" on the B side. Band founders Robby Krieger and John Densmore would assemble an entirely new group of musicians for the band's second and final album, 1975's Hear and Now.

Critical reception

In a retrospective review for AllMusic, Joe Viglione gave the album a rating of three and a half out of five stars. He noted that the album is "very musical and great stuff, it just had no image, introduced us to new personalities."

1996 compilation

Both albums by the Butts Band were repackaged together and released in 1996 as One Way label's, "The Complete Recordings". Two studio bonus tracks, "That's All Right" and "Lovin' You For All The Right Reasons", were added to the album.

Track listing 
"I Won't Be Alone Anymore" (Robby Krieger)
"Baja Bus" (Robby Krieger)
"Sweet Danger" (Jess Roden)
"Pop-A-Top" (Jess Roden, Phil Chen)
"Be with Me" (Robby Krieger)
"New Ways" (Jess Roden)
"Love Your Brother" (Robby Krieger)
"Kansas City" (Jerry Leiber, Mike Stoller)

Personnel 
According to the liner notes:

 Jess Roden – vocals, rhythm guitar
 Robby Krieger – lead guitar
 Roy Davies – keyboards, synthesizers
 Phil Chen – bass, rhythm guitar
 John Densmore – drums

Additional musicians
 Mick Weaver – Wurlitzer piano, organ
 Larry McDonald – congas 
 Allan Sharp – congas

References 

1974 debut albums
Albums produced by Bruce Botnick
Blue Thumb Records albums
Butts Band albums